Sébastien Le Paih (born 4 November 1974 in Nantes) was a French professional football player.

He played on the professional level in Ligue 1 for FC Nantes and Ligue 2 for Le Mans Union Club 72, FC Lorient and Angers SCO.

1974 births
Living people
French footballers
Ligue 1 players
Ligue 2 players
Championnat National players
FC Nantes players
Le Mans FC players
FC Lorient players
Angers SCO players
Thonon Evian Grand Genève F.C. players
USJA Carquefou players
SO Romorantin players
Association football midfielders
Footballers from Nantes